John Matthai CIE (1886–1959) was an economist who served as India's first Railway Minister and subsequently as India's Finance Minister, taking office shortly after the presentation of India's first Budget, in 1948.
He was born on January 10, 1886, as the son of Challiyal Thomas Matthai and Anna Thayyil to an Anglican Syrian Christian family. He graduated in economics from the University of Madras. He served as a Professor and Head in University of Madras from 1922 to 1925. He presented two Budgets as India's Finance Minister, but resigned following the 1950 Budget in protest against the increasing power of the Planning Commission and P. C. Mahalanobis. He was the first Chairman of the State Bank of India when it was set up in 1955. He was the founding President of the Governing Body of the National Council of Applied Economic Research (NCAER) in New Delhi, India's first independent economic policy institute established in 1956. He served as the Vice Chancellor of the University of Mumbai from 1955 till 1957 and then as the first Vice Chancellor of the University of Kerala from 1957 to 1959. His nephew, Verghese Kurien, is generally recognized as the architect of India's White Revolution. Dr. John Matthai Centre, Thrissur, located on the large plot of land donated by his family, is named in his honour. His wife, Achamma Matthai was an Indian social worker and a women's rights activist. The Government of India honoured him in 1954 with the award of Padma Shri, the fourth highest Indian civilian award, for his contributions to the society,

John Matthai was invested as a Companion of the Order of the Indian Empire (CIE) in 1934, and was awarded the Padma Vibhushan in 1959. NCAER, led by the President of its Governing Body, Nandan Nilekani and with support from the Nilekani Philanthropies, honoured John Matthai in 2019 by naming NCAER's new office building at its campus in New Delhi as the John Matthai Tower.

References

External links
Dr. John Matthai Centre

1886 births
1959 deaths
Politicians from Kozhikode
Malayali politicians
Indian National Congress politicians from Kerala
First Nehru ministry
Members of the Constituent Assembly of India
Recipients of the Padma Vibhushan in literature & education
Companions of the Order of the Indian Empire
Madras Christian College alumni
Railway Ministers of India
Finance Ministers of India
Ministers for Corporate Affairs
Members of the Council of the Governor General of India